Mousehole Association Football Club is a football club based in Paul, Cornwall. It is named for the nearby village of Mousehole.

History
Mousehole joined the Cornwall Combination in 1960–61 and were promoted to the South West Peninsula League Division One West on its formation in 2007, after finishing as Combination runners-up the previous season. They won Division One West in 2015–16. At the end of 2018–19 the league was restructured, and Mousehole successfully applied for promotion to the Premier Division West, at Step 6 of the National League System.

Since 2017, the club have had a sponsorship arrangement with the Endorsed Group, a recruitment and software company run by a local businessman. Together with the club they have set up the Endorsed Academy, aiming to improve coaching standards and provide opportunities for young footballers in Cornwall. Mousehole hosted a pre-season tournament in July 2018, the Endorsed Cup, featuring youth teams from Newcastle United, Huddersfield Town and Bolton Wanderers.

In 2018, an approach was made by Mousehole concerning a possible merger between themselves and neighbours Penzance A.F.C., amid concerns that Trungle Parc may not prove viable as Mousehole progress through the leagues. A further approach was made by Penzance in 2019, but in May, Mousehole released a statement confirming they had withdrawn from the discussions. In 2021, they were promoted to the Premier Division of the Western League based on their results in the abandoned 2019–20 and 2020–21 seasons.

Honours
Cornwall Combination
Runners-up 1985–86, 2006–07
South West Peninsula League
Division One West Champions 2015–16

References

External links

Official website

 
1923 establishments in England
Association football clubs established in 1923
Football clubs in Cornwall
South West Peninsula League
Western Football League